Curie Island is a small rocky island near the eastern end of the Géologie Archipelago, lying  southwest of Derby Island, close north of Astrolabe Glacier Tongue. It was photographed from the air by U.S. Navy Operation Highjump, 1946–47. It was charted by the French Antarctic Expedition, 1949–51, and named by them for the noted French family of physicists and chemists: Pierre Curie and Marie Curie.

See also 
 List of Antarctic and sub-Antarctic islands

References 

Islands of Adélie Land
Pierre Curie
Marie Curie